Robert Heinz Abeles (January 14, 1926–June 18, 2000) was an American biochemist, dedicated in particular to enzymology and chemical biology. He was born in Vienna, but his family moved to Chicago in 1939, and he made most of his career at Brandeis University. In his later years, Abeles had serious health problems, including Hodgkin's disease in the 1970s and Parkinson's disease in the last ten years.

Education 

After undergraduate studies at the University of Chicago, and doctoral work at the University of Colorado, Abeles carried out post-doctoral research under the supervision of Frank Westheimer in the chemistry department at Harvard.  This research formed the starting point for his life's work on the mechanisms of the chemical reactions of living systems.

Ohio State, Michigan and Brandeis 

After faculty appointments at Ohio State University and the University of Michigan, moved in 1964 to the recently inaugurated department of biochemistry at Brandeis, and remained there for 36 years, until he died in 2000. He and  William Jencks together turned Brandeis into a leading center in the world for chemical biochemistry.

Research 

Abeles, together with Jencks and Westheimer, fostered a strong belief that chemical mechanisms could explain all aspects of metabolism.

With Alan Maycock, Abeles carried out important work on suicide enzyme inactivators, using their expertise to design inactivators of γ-cystathionase, and other enzymes.

Awards 
Abeles was elected to the National Academy of Sciences in 1999, and inducted into the Medicinal Chemistry Hall of Fame of the American Chemical Society. He received the Welch Award in Chemistry in 1995.

References 

2000 deaths
American biochemists
1926 births
University of Chicago alumni
University of Colorado alumni
Ohio State University faculty
University of Michigan faculty
Brandeis University faculty
Members of the United States National Academy of Sciences